Bleeding heart may refer to:

Flowering plants
 Bleeding-heart, perennial herbaceous plants of the family Papaveraceae, including:
 Lamprocapnos spectabilis (formerly Dicentra spectabilis), a popular garden plant with arching sprays of pendent red and white (or pure white) flowers
 Dicentra, a genus native to eastern Asia and North America
 Ehrendorferia, also known as eardrops
 Dactylicapnos, herbaceous climbers
 Bleeding-heart, flowering shrubs, lianas, or small trees of the mint family Lamiaceae, in the genus Clerodendrum (also called glorybowers or bagflowers)
 Bleeding heart tree (Homalanthus populifolius), of the family Euphorbiaceae, an Australian rainforest plant, also known as Queensland poplar

Music
 A Bleeding Heart, a 2003 EP by New Zealand band the Bleeders
 Bleeding Heart (album), a 1994 posthumous live album by Jimi Hendrix
 "Bleeding Heart" (song), a 1965 Elmore James song
 "Bleeding Heart Disease" (song), a song by NOFX from the 1996 album Heavy Petting Zoo
 "Bleeding Heart", a song by the Brazilian metal band Angra, from the EP Hunters and Prey
 "Bleeding Heart", a song by the German power metal band Freedom Call from the album Eternity
 The Bleeding Heart Band, the backing band for Roger Waters for a brief period of his post-Pink Floyd solo career

Other uses
 Bleeding Heart (film), a 2015 American film
 Bleeding-hearts, doves in the genus Gallicolumba
 Bleeding heart tetra, Hyphessobrycon erythrostigma
 Bleeding Heart Yard, a courtyard in London, England
 Bleeding Hearts, a 1994 crime novel by Ian Rankin, under the pseudonym Jack Harvey
 "Bleeding Heart", an episode of season 2 of The Mentalist

See also
  Bleeding-heart libertarianism (or liberalism)
 Bleeding heart liberal
 Catholic iconography:
 Sacred heart of Christ, often depicted bleeding
 Heart of the virgin Mary, often depicted bleeding
 Heartbleed (disambiguation)